Jean Avisse (1723 – 1796) produced chairs, sofas, chaises  and similar furniture in 18th century France.

His chairs are elaborately decorated with natural images such as shells, flowers, and leaves. He stamped his work with the signature IAVISSE. Reproductions in his style are often called Avisse.

He was not very successful during his life.  Twice he was forced into bankruptcy, first in 1769 and again in 1776.  He died in Paris.

References
Fleming, John and Honour, Hugh (1990) "Avisse, Jean" The Penguin Dictionary of Decorative Arts (rev.ed.) Viking, London;

External links

 "Armchair 1751" Fine Arts Museums of San Francisco;
 "Pair of Armchairs"  J. Paul Getty Museum;
 "Avisse Armchair - all cane - tall " The Elysee Collection
 "Jean Avisse " brief bio, J. Paul Getty Museum;
 "Jean Avisse " brief bio, World-Wide Art Resources

French furniture designers
French furniture makers
1796 deaths
1723 births